Richard Amookohome Anane (born 18 February 1989) is an English footballer who plays as a defender.

Career
Anane made his début for Bury away to Rochdale, in the 3–1 win in the Football League Trophy on 9 October 2007. He was loaned out to Fleetwood Town in April 2009.

He spent two years playing for Woking before moving on to play for  Droylsden.

In 2012, he played for Woodley Sports before signing a full-time contract with the club after it changed its name to Stockport Sports for the 2012–13 season.

In June 2013, Ricky Anane was awarded the North West Counties 'Player of the Year' for 2012/13 season.

In December 2015 he signed for Barnton F.C. after a spell in Australia.

References

External links
Ricky Anane player profile at buryfc.co.uk

1989 births
Living people
Footballers from Manchester
English footballers
Bury F.C. players
Workington A.F.C. players
Fleetwood Town F.C. players
Woking F.C. players
Droylsden F.C. players
Association football fullbacks
Stockport Sports F.C. players
Barnton F.C. players